The documented history begins when Oranyan came to rule the Oyo Empire, which became dominant in the early 17th century. The older traditions of the formerly dominant Ile-Ife kingdom are largely oral.

Before Oyo Empire
The history of the Yoruba people begins in Ile-Ife(Ife Empire). This kingdom was founded by the deity Oduduwa, who is believed to have created the world. Oduduwa was the first divine king of the Yoruba people. It is said the Yoruba people believe that their civilization began at Ile-Ife where the gods descended to earth.

The Ethnic group became popular internationally due to their trading with the Portuguese which gave them guns for their trade. The Yoruba were invaded by the Fulani in the early 1800s, which pushed the people to the South. In the late 1800s, they formed a treaty with the British Empire and were colonized by Britain beginning in 1901.

The people who lived in Yorubaland, at least by the seventh century BC, were not initially known as the Yoruba, although they shared a common ethnicity and language group. The historical Yoruba develop in situ, out of earlier (Mesolithic) Volta-Niger populations, by the 1st millennium BC.

Archaeologically, the settlement at Ile-Ife can be dated to the 4th century BC, with urban structures appearing in the 8th-10th Centuries. "Between 700 and 900 A.D., the city began to develop as a major artistic center," And "by the 12th Century Ife artists were creating bronze, stone, and terracotta sculptures." The phase of Ile-Ife before the rise of Oyo, ca. 1100–1600, is sometimes described as a "golden age" of Ile-Ife.

Oyo Empire
Ife was surpassed by the Oyo Empire as the dominant Yoruba military and political power between 1600 and 1800 AD. The nearby Benin Empire was also a powerful force between 1300 and 1850.

Oyo developed in the 17th century and become one of the largest Yoruba kingdoms, while Ile-Ife remained as a religiously significant rival to its power at the site of the divine creation of the earth in Yoruba mythology. After Oduduwa's ascension in Ile-Ife, he had a son. This son later became the first ruler of the Oyo empire.

The Oyo kingdom subjugated the kingdom of Dahomey. It traded with European merchants on the coast through Ajase. The wealth of the empire increased, and its political leader's wealth increased as well. This state of affairs continued until Oba Abiodun, Oyo's last great ruler, engaged his opponents in a bitter civil war that had a ruinous effect on economic development and the trade with the European merchants. The downfall of the kingdom came soon after, as Abiodun became concerned with little other than the display of royal wealth. Oyo's empire had collapsed by the 1830s.

Like Oyo itself, most of the surrounding city states were controlled by Obas, elected priestly monarchs, and councils made up of Oloyes, recognised leaders of royal, noble, and often even common descent, who joined them in ruling over the kingdoms through a series of guilds and cults. Different states saw differing ratios of power between the kingship and the chiefs' council. Some, such as Oyo, had powerful, autocratic monarchs with almost total control, while in others such as the Ijebu city-states, the senatorial councils were supreme and the Ọba served as something of a figurehead.

In all cases, however, Yoruba monarchs were subject to the continuing approval of their constituents as a matter of policy, and could be easily compelled to abdicate for demonstrating dictatorial tendencies or incompetence. The order to vacate the throne was usually communicated through an àrokò or symbolic message, which usually took the form of parrots' eggs delivered in a covered calabash bowl by the Oloyes.

Modern history

The Yoruba eventually established a federation of city-states under the political ascendancy of the city state of Oyo, located on the Northern fringes of Yorubaland in the savanna plains between the forests of present Southwest Nigeria and the Niger River.

Following a Jihad led by Uthman Dan Fodio and a rapid consolidation of the Hausa city states of contemporary northern Nigeria, the Fulani Sokoto Caliphate invaded and annexed the buffer Nupe Kingdom. It then began to advance southwards into Ọyọ lands. Shortly afterwards, its armies overran the Yoruba military capital of Ilorin, and then sacked and destroyed Ọyọ-Ile, the royal seat of the Ọyọ Empire.

Following this, Ọyọ-Ile was abandoned, and the Ọyọ retreated south to the present city of Oyo (formerly known as "Ago d'oyo", or "Oyo Atiba") in a forested region where the cavalry of the Sokoto Caliphate was less effective. Further attempts by the Sokoto Caliphate to expand southwards were checked by the Yoruba who had rallied in defense under the military leadership of the ascendant Ibadan clan, which rose from the old Oyo Empire, and of the Ijebu city-states.

However, the Oyo hegemony had been dealt a mortal blow. The other Yoruba city-states broke free of Oyo dominance, and subsequently became embroiled in a series of internecine conflicts that soon metamorphosed into a full scale civil war. These events weakened the southern Yorubas considerably as the Nigerian government pursued harsh methods to bring an end to the civil war. In 1960, greater Yorubaland was subsumed into the Federal Republic of Nigeria. The historical records of the Yoruba, which became more accessible in the nineteenth century with the more permanent arrival of the Europeans, tell of heavy Jihad raids by the mounted Fulani warriors of the north as well as of endemic intercity warfare amongst the Yoruba themselves. Archaeological evidence of the greatness of their ancient civilization in the form of, amongst other things, impressive architectural achievements like Sungbo's Eredo that are centuries old, nevertheless abound.

Major towns, cities, and the diaspora 
Many Yoruba peoples organize themselves into villages, towns, and cities in the form of kingdoms. Major cities include Ile-Ife, Oyo,Eko(Lagos), Abeokuta, Ipokia, Ibadan, Ijebu-Ode, Iwo , and Akure etc. Some towns and cities of the Yoruba people are collectively considered to be clans due to similarities in their origins and cultures. Several other cities, though non-Yoruba, have histories of being influenced by the Yoruba. These cities are Warri, Benin City, Okene, and Auchi.

The Yoruba diaspora has two main groupings. The first one is composed of the recent immigrants that moved to the United States and the United Kingdom after the political and economic changes in the 1960s and 1980s. The second group is much older, and is composed of descendants of kidnapped Yoruba who arrived as slaves to countries such as the United States, Cuba, Trinidad, Brazil, Grenada, and other countries in the Caribbean and South America in the 19th century.

Much like in the case of Yorubaland itself, many people who belong to the Yoruba diaspora are Muslims or Christians. Yoruba traditional worship remains influential in diaspora communities, however.

References

Bibliography 
 Adebayo Kayode "After Oduduwa"???
 Akintoye, Stephen Adebanji: A History of the Yoruba People, Dakar, 2010.
Idowu, Bolaji E. : "Olodumare: God in Yoruba Belief" Wazobia, New York, NY 1994 .
 Idowu, Bolaji: Olodumare: God in Yoruba Belief, London 1962.
 Johnson, Samuel: History of the Yorubas, London 1921.
 Lucas, Jonathan Olumide "The Religion of the Yorubas", Lagos 1948.
 Law, Robin: The Oyo Empire, c. 1600 – c. 1836, Oxford 1977.
 Smith, Robert: Kingdoms of the Yoruba, 1st ed. 1969, 3rd ed. London 1988.

 
Yoruba history